Marko Jesic  (born 7 August 1989 in Fairfield, New South Wales) is an Australian football player of Serbian descent who plays for Marconi Stallions FC.

Club career

Jesic grew up on the streets of Bossley Park in Sydney's south west and was promoted to the Newcastle Jets A-League squad after playing in the youth league. Jesic is a graduate from the Australian Institute of Sport.

Newcastle United Jets
Marko started his football career at AIS. Upon his graduation from the Australian Institute of Sport he moved to Newcastle United Jets in 2008.
On 6 October 2008 he made his A-League debut for Newcastle United Jets as a substitute against Wellington Phoenix. In his second game Marko scored his first goal for the Jets on his starting debut in Newcastle's 1–0 win over Melbourne Victory on 18 October 2008 in the 86th minute.

In 2009 Marko competed in the AFC Champions League with the Newcastle United Jets. On 7 April 2009 Newcastle Jets played against Nagoya Grampus and he was the man of the match.

Sun Pegasus
On 30 December 2013 it was announced that Marko had signed with Hong Kong club Sun Pegasus.

Return to Rockdale
On his return to Rockdale, he scored a brace in the opening game of the 2015 NPL NSW season against APIA Leichhardt in their 4–2 loss.

Marconi Stallions
In October 2015, Marconi Stallions announced that they had signed Jesic, along with other high-profile names, for their 2016 NPL2 campaign.

Honours
With Australia:
 International Cor Groenewegen Tournament (U-20): 2009
 AFF U19 Youth Championship: 2008
 Weifang Cup (U-18): 2007

Honours
Sun Pegasus
Hong Kong Senior Challenge Shield Runners-up: 2013–14

References

External links
 Newcastle Jets profile
 FFA – Young Socceroos profile
  http://au.fourfourtwo.com/news/189296,jeffers-a-dream-come-true-jesic.aspx

1989 births
Living people
Sportspeople from Canberra
Soccer players from the Australian Capital Territory
Australian people of Serbian descent
A-League Men players
Newcastle Jets FC players
Marconi Stallions FC players
Australian Institute of Sport soccer players
New South Wales Institute of Sport alumni
Soccer players from Sydney
Association football forwards
Australian soccer players